Ren Mengqian (Chinese: 任梦茜; born 4 October 1993) is a pole vaulter from China. She competed at the 2015 World Championships in Beijing.
 
Her personal bests in the event are 4.50 metres outdoors (Taiyuan 2015) and 4.40 metres indoors (Beijing 2013).

Competition record

References

Chinese female pole vaulters
Living people
Place of birth missing (living people)
1993 births
World Athletics Championships athletes for China
Athletes (track and field) at the 2016 Summer Olympics
Olympic athletes of China